Each "article" in this category is a collection of entries about several stamp issuers, presented in alphabetical order. The entries are formulated on the micro model and so provide summary information about all known issuers.  

See the :Category:Compendium of postage stamp issuers page for details of the project.

Nisiro/Nisiros 

Refer 	Nisyros

Nisyros 

Dates 	1912 – 1932
Capital 	Mandrakhi
Currency  	100 centesimi = 1 lira

Refer 	Aegean Islands (Dodecanese)

Niuafo'ou 

Dates 	1983 –
Capital 	
Currency 	100 seniti = 1 pa'anga

Main Article Needed

Niue 

Dates 	1902 –
Capital 	Alofi
Currency 	(1902) 12 pence = 1 shilling; 20 shillings = 1 pound
		(1967) 100 cents = 1 dollar

Main Article Needed

Niutao 

Refer 	Tuvalu

Norfolk Island 

Dates 	1947 –
Capital 	Kingston
Currency 	(1947) 12 pence = 1 shilling; 20 shillings = 1 pound
		(1966) 100 cents = 1 dollar

Main Article  Postage stamps and postal history of Norfolk Island

Norge 

Refer 	Norway

North Borneo 

Dates 	1883 – 1963
Capital 	Jesselton (Kota Kinabalu)
Currency 	100 cents = 1 Malayan dollar

Main Article Needed 

See also 	Sabah

North Borneo (British Military Administration) 

Dates 	1945 only
Currency  	100 cents = 1 Malayan dollar

Refer 	BA/BMA Issues

North Borneo (Japanese Occupation) 

Dates 	1942 – 1945
Currency 	(1942) 100 cents = 1 dollar
		(1945) 10 rin = 1 sen; 100 sen = 1 yen

Refer 	Japanese Occupation Issues

North China (Japanese Occupation) 

Dates 	1942 – 1945
Currency 	100 cents = 1 dollar

Refer 	Japanese Occupation Issues

North China (People's Post) 

Dates 	1948 – 1950
Currency 	100 cents = 1 dollar

Refer 	CPR Regional Issues

North East China (People's Post) 

Dates 	1946 – 1950
Currency 	100 cents = 1 dollar

Refer 	CPR Regional Issues

North Eastern Provinces 

Dates 	1946 – 1948
Currency 	100 cents = 1 dollar

Refer 	Chinese Provinces

North German Confederation 

Dates 	1868 – 1871
Capital 	Berlin
Currency 	30 groschen = 1 thaler = 60 kreuzer = 1 gulden

Main Article Needed 

See also 	German States;
		Germany (Imperial)

North Ingermanland 

Dates 	1920 only
Capital 	
Currency 	100 pennia = 1 mark

Refer 	Russian Civil War Issues

North Korea 

Dates 	1948 –
Capital 	Pyongyang
Currency 	100 chon = 1 won

Main Article Postage stamps and postal history of North Korea

Includes 	South Korea (North Korean Occupation)

North Korea (Russian Occupation) 

Dates 	1946 – 1948
Currency 	100 chon = 1 won

Refer 	Russian Occupation Issues

North Vietnam 

Dates 	1946 – 1976
Capital 	Hanoi
Currency 	(1946) 100 cents = 1 dong
		(1959) 100 xu = 1 dong

Main Article Needed 

Includes 	National Front for Liberation of South Vietnam

See also 	South Vietnam;
		Vietnam

North West China (People's Post) 

Dates 	1949 only
Currency 	100 cents = 1 dollar

Refer 	CPR Regional Issues

North West Pacific Islands 

Dates 	1915 – 1925
Capital 	Rabaul
Currency 	12 pence = 1 shilling; 20 shillings = 1 pound

Refer 	Papua New Guinea

North West Russia 

Refer 	North Western Army;
		Northern Army;
		Western Army

North West Saxony (Russian Zone) 

Dates 	1945 – 1946
Capital 	Leipzig
Currency 	100 pfennige = 1 mark

Refer 	Germany (Allied Occupation)

North Western Army 

Dates 	1919 – 1920
Currency 	100 kopecks = 1 Russian ruble

Refer 	Russian Civil War Issues

Northern Army 

Dates 	1919 – 1920
Currency 	100 kopecks = 1 Russian ruble

Refer 	Russian Civil War Issues

Northern Epirus 

Refer 	Epirus

Northern Ireland 

Dates 	1958 –
Capital 	Belfast
Currency 	(1958) 12 pence = 1 shilling; 20 shillings = 1 pound
		(1971) 100 pence = 1 pound

Refer 	Great Britain (Regional Issues)

Northern Nigeria 

Dates 	1900 – 1914
Capital 	Kaduna
Currency 	12 pence = 1 shilling; 20 shillings = 1 pound

Refer 	Nigerian Territories

Northern Rhodesia 

Dates 	1925 – 1964
Capital 	Lusaka
Currency 	12 pence = 1 shilling; 20 shillings = 1 pound

Main Article Needed 

See also 	Zambia

Northern Territory 

Refer 	South Australia

Northern Zone, Morocco 

Dates 	1956 – 1958
Capital 	Tetuan
Currency 	100 centimos = 1 peseta

Refer 	Morocco

See also 	Spanish Morocco

Norway 

Dates 	1855 –
Capital 	Oslo
Currency 	(1855) 120 skilling = 1 speciedaler
		(1877) 100 ore = 1 krone

Main Article Needed

Norwegian Dependency 

Refer 	Norway

Nossi-Be 

Dates 	1889 – 1891
Capital 	Hell-Ville
Currency 	100 centimes = 1 franc

Refer 	Madagascar & Dependencies

Nova Scotia 

Dates 	1853 – 1868
Capital 	Halifax
Currency 	(1853) 12 pence = 1 shilling; 20 shillings = 1 pound
		(1860) 100 cents = 1 dollar

Refer 	Canadian Provinces

Nowanuggur 

Refer 	Nawanager

Nui 

Refer 	Tuvalu

Nukufetau 

Refer 	Tuvalu

Nukulaelae 

Refer 	Tuvalu

Nyasaland Protectorate 

Dates 	1907 – 1964
Capital 	Zomba
Currency 	12 pence = 1 shilling; 20 shillings = 1 pound

Main Article Needed 

Includes 	Nyasa-Rhodesian Force (NF)

See also 	British Central Africa;
		Malawi

Nyasa-Rhodesian Force (NF) 

Dates 	1916 only
Currency 	12 pence = 1 shilling; 20 shillings = 1 pound

Refer 	Nyasaland Protectorate

Nyassa / Nyassa Company 

Dates 	1897 – 1929
Capital 	Pemba
Currency 	(1897) 1000 reis = 1 milreis
		(1913) 100 centavos = 1 escudo

Refer  Postage stamps and postal history of the Nyassa Company

See also  Nyassa Company

References

Bibliography
 Stanley Gibbons Ltd, Europe and Colonies 1970, Stanley Gibbons Ltd, 1969
 Stanley Gibbons Ltd, various catalogues
 Stuart Rossiter & John Flower, The Stamp Atlas, W H Smith, 1989
 XLCR Stamp Finder and Collector's Dictionary, Thomas Cliffe Ltd, c.1960

External links
 AskPhil – Glossary of Stamp Collecting Terms
 Encyclopaedia of Postal History

Nisiros